1066 (MLXVI) was a common year starting on Sunday of the Julian calendar.

Events

Worldwide 
 March 20 – Halley's Comet reaches perihelion. Its appearance is subsequently recorded in the Bayeux Tapestry.

Asia 
 unknown dates 
Chinese imperial official Sima Guang presents the emperor with an 8-volume Tongzhi (通志; "Comprehensive Records"), chronicling Chinese history from 403 BCE to the end of the Qin Dynasty in 207 BCE. The emperor then issues an edict for the compilation of Guang's universal history of China, allocating funds for the costs of compilation and research assistants such as Liu Ban, Liu Shu and Fan Zuyu.
The Abu Hanifa Mosque is established in Baghdad, when the Grand Vizier of the Seljuk Empire, Abu Saad al-Khwarizmi or al-Mustawfi, builds a shrine for Abu Hanifa near his tomb.

Europe 
 September 12 – William, Duke of Normandy, assembles a fleet (around 700 warships) at Saint-Valery-sur-Somme, in readiness for an invasion of England.
 December 30 – Granada massacre: A Muslim mob storms the royal palace in Granada, crucifies the Jewish vizier Yusuf ibn Naghrela, and massacres most of the Jewish population.
 Huy becomes the first town in the Low Countries to be granted city rights, by Theodwin of Liège.
 Hedeby (located on the Jutland Peninsula) is sacked and burned by the West Slavs, after which it is slowly abandoned.
 The Republic of Genoa, jealous of the recent successes of its former allies, launches a naval assault on the Republic of Pisa. 
 King Stenkil (or Steinkell) dies after a 6-year reign. Two rivals named Eric battle for power in Sweden, both claiming the throne.
 Magnus II (Haraldsson), a son of Harald Hardrada, is crowned king of Norway. He unites Western Norway and Northern Norway.
 Fulk IV, Count of Anjou, known as "the Quarreller", is at war with his brother Geoffrey III, contesting the lands of Anjou and Touraine left to them by their uncle Geoffrey II, Count of Anjou (Martel).
 City of Šibenik first mentioned under its present name in a Charter of the Croatian King Petar Krešimir IV

England and Scotland 
 January – Harold Godwinson marries Ealdgyth, daughter of Ælfgar (earl of Mercia), and widow of King Gruffydd ap Llywelyn.
 January 5 – Edward the Confessor dies after a 24-year reign at London. The Witenagemot (or Witan) proclaims Harold Godwinson king of England.
 January 6 – Harold Godwinson (Harold II) is crowned king of England, probably in the new Westminster Abbey, where Edward the Confessor's funeral took place not long before the coronation.
 September 18 – Harald Hardrada of Norway lands on the beaches of Scarborough and begins his invasion of England. 
 September 20 – Battle of Fulford: Norwegian forces under Harald Hardrada defeat the English earls Edwin and Morcar.
 September 25 – Battle of Stamford Bridge: Harold II defeats the forces of Harald Hardrada and his own brother Tostig Godwinson.
 September 27 – William, Duke of Normandy and his army set sail from the mouth of the River Somme, beginning the Norman conquest of England. The following day he lands on the English coast at Pevensey, splits his forces, and sails with the main army to Hastings.
 October 6 – Harold II marches south from Stamford Bridge (near York) to counter the threat of the invasion by William. Reaching London within five days, he leaves a short time later. After a two-day march he and his army reach Caldbec Hill.  
 October 14 – Battle of Hastings: William and Harold II meet in battle at Hastings. Although Harold has the superior position on the battlefield, he is defeated and killed by William, invading England.
 October 15 – Edgar Ætheling is proclaimed king of England (but is never crowned). He is soon forced to submit to the rule of William the Conqueror.
 December – William the Conqueror moves along the south coast to Dover, and builds fortifications in the existing castle at the top of the cliffs. He moves to Canterbury and finally enters London. Archbishop Stigand and other English leaders submit to William's rule. On December 25, he is crowned as king William I of England in Westminster Abbey over Edward the Confessor's grave.
 unknown date – Tain becomes the first town in Scotland to be chartered as a royal burgh by King Malcolm III (Canmore).

Births 
 February 22 – Lý Nhân Tông, Vietnamese emperor (d. 1127)
 Al-Afdal Shahanshah, vizier of the Fatimid Caliphate (d. 1121)
 Gilbert Fitz Richard, English nobleman (approximate date)
 Godfrey of Amiens, French abbot and bishop (d. 1115)
 Henry, count of Portugal (House of Burgundy) (d. 1112)
 Irene Doukaina (or Ducaena), Byzantine empress (d. 1138)
 Wang Jha-ji, Korean politician and general (d. 1122)

Deaths 
 January 5 – Edward the Confessor, king of England
 February 3 – Rostislav of Tmutarakan, Kievan Rus' prince (b. 1038)
 February 12 – Everard I of Breteuil, French nobleman
 March 26 – Ibn Sidah, Moorish linguist and lexicographer (b. 1007)
 April 9 – Al-Bayhaqi, Persian Sunni hadith scholar (b. 994)
 May 21 – Su Xun, Chinese scholar and writer (b. 1009)
 June 6 – Gottschalk (or Godescalc), Obotrite prince
 June 27 – Arialdo, Italian nobleman and deacon
 August 15 – Al-Qadi Abu Ya'la, Arab Hanbali scholar (b. 990)
 September 25 (killed at the Battle of Stamford Bridge):
 Eystein Orre, Norwegian nobleman
 Harald III (Harald Hardrada), king of Norway
 Tostig Godwinson, earl of Northumbria
 September 25 – Maria Haraldsdotter, Norwegian princess
 October 14 (killed at the Battle of Hastings):
 Harold II (Harold Godwinson), king of England
 Leofwine Godwinson, brother of Harold II
 Gyrth Godwinson, brother of Harold II
 Taillefer, Norman minstrel
 November 10 – John Scotus, bishop of Mecklenburg
 Sacrificed to Radegast, the god of hospitality.
 November 14 – Fujiwara no Akihira, Japanese nobleman
 December 11 – Conan II, duke of Brittany
 December 30 – Yusuf ibn Naghrela, Jewish vizier
 Abu al-Hakam al-Kirmani, Moorish philosopher
 Ali al-Sulayhi, sultan of Yemen and Tihamah (b. 966)
 Conrad of Pfullingen, archbishop of Trier
 Herluin de Conteville, Norman nobleman (b. 1001)
 Kraft of Meissen (or Crafto), German bishop
 Reiner of Meissen (or Rainer), German bishop
 Śrīpati, Indian astronomer and mathematician (b. 1019)
 Theobald of Provins, French hermit (b. 1033)
 Udayadityavarman II, Cambodian ruler
 Yahya of Antioch, Byzantine historian

References